A trustee de son tort is a person who may be regarded as owing fiduciary duties by a course of conduct that amounts to a wrong, or a tort. Accordingly, a trustee de son tort is not a person who is formally appointed as a trustee, but one who assumes such a role, and then cannot be heard to argue that he did not owe fiduciary duties.

Overview
The courts may hold a person a constructive trustee instead of prosecuting and, thereby, impose the liabilities of an actual trustee in accounting for his or her acts.

Lewin on Trusts  says at 42-74: 

Thomas and Hudson's The Law on Trusts says at para 30.03: 

A "trustee de son tort" is to be contrasted with a delegate who is appointed by a trustee to undertake certain functions: such a person derives his authority from the trustee and is entitled to act in accordance with the delegated authority without himself becoming a trustee. A delegate, in such circumstance, has done no "wrong" and is not intermeddling in the trust and so does not become a “trustee de son tort”.

The court also considered the concept of a trustee de son tort and whether an agent, appointed by a duly constituted trustee, could itself be a trustee de son tort in circumstances where the agent's actions caused loss to the trust fund. 

It was argued that it was commonplace in the trust industry for the administration of a trust to be carried out largely by another company (other than the trustee) within the same group of companies as the corporate trustee. It would cause considerable surprise in the industry if such a company was to find itself designated a trustee de son tort. Because it was common practice it was important that an authoritative decision be given as to whether such an administrative company should be treated as a trustee de son tort.

Cases

Barnes v Addy (1874) LR 9 Ch App 244
Mara v Browne [1896] 1 Ch 199
Re Barney [1892] 2 Ch 265
Williams-Ashman v Price and Williams [1942] Ch 219

See also
English trusts law
US trusts law
Executor
Morgan v. Hamlet, 113 U.S. 449 (1885)

References

Wills and trusts